James Naka (born 9 October 1984 in Honiara) is a Solomon Islands footballer currently playing for Nalkutan. He plays as a midfielder or forward. He has played in 10 editions of the FIFA Beach Soccer World Cup and also represented his country 7 times.

International career

International goals
Scores and results list Solomon Islands' goal tally first.

References

Solomon Islands footballers
1984 births
People from Honiara
Living people
Kossa F.C. players
Association football midfielders
Association football forwards
Nalkutan F.C. players
Solomon Islands international footballers
Expatriate footballers in Vanuatu
Solomon Islands expatriate sportspeople in Vanuatu
2012 OFC Nations Cup players
2016 OFC Nations Cup players